The FIL European Luge Natural Track Championships 1991 took place in Völs am Schlern, Italy.

Men's singles

Women's singles

Men's doubles

Niewiadomski and Samulski become the first non-Austrian or Italian competitors to medal at the natural track European championships.

Medal table

References
Men's doubles natural track European champions
Men's singles natural track European champions
Women's singles natural track European champions

FIL European Luge Natural Track Championships
1991 in luge
1991 in Italian sport
Luge in Italy
International sports competitions hosted by Italy